Jeremiah 30 is the thirtieth chapter of the Book of Jeremiah in the Hebrew Bible or the Old Testament of the Christian Bible. It is numbered as Jeremiah 37 in the Septuagint. This book contains prophecies attributed to the prophet Jeremiah, and is one of the Books of the Prophets. The Jerusalem Bible refers to chapters 30 and 31 as "the Book of Consolation", and Lutheran theologian Ernst Hengstenberg calls these two chapters "the triumphal hymn of Israel’s salvation". This chapter contains the promises to restoration.

Text 
The original text of Jeremiah 30 was written in the Hebrew language. This chapter is divided into 24 verses in Christian Bible, but 25 verses in Hebrew Bible, because verse 30:25 in Hebrew Bible is verse 31:1 in Christian Bible. This article follows the common numbering in Christian English Bible versions, with notes to the numbering in Hebrew Bible versions.

Textual witnesses
Some early manuscripts containing the text of this chapter in Hebrew are of the Masoretic Text tradition, which includes the Codex Cairensis (895), the Petersburg Codex of the Prophets (916), Aleppo Codex (10th century), Codex Leningradensis (1008). Some fragments containing parts of this chapter were found among the Dead Sea Scrolls, i.e., 4QJerc (4Q72; 1st century BCE), with extant verses 6–9, 17–24 (similar to Masoretic Text).

There is also a translation into Koine Greek known as the Septuagint (with a different chapter and verse numbering), made in the last few centuries BCE. Extant ancient manuscripts of the Septuagint version include Codex Vaticanus (B; B; 4th century), Codex Sinaiticus (S; BHK: S; 4th century), Codex Alexandrinus (A; A; 5th century) and Codex Marchalianus (Q; Q; 6th century). The Septuagint version doesn't contain a part what is generally known to be verses 10–11 in Christian Bibles.

Verse numbering
The order of chapters and verses of the Book of Jeremiah in the English Bibles, Masoretic Text (Hebrew), and Vulgate (Latin), in some places differs from that in Septuagint (LXX, the Greek Bible used in the Eastern Orthodox Church and others) according to Rahlfs or Brenton. The following table is taken with minor adjustments from Brenton's Septuagint, page 971.

The order of Computer Assisted Tools for Septuagint/Scriptural Study (CATSS) based on Alfred Rahlfs' Septuaginta (1935) differs in some details from Joseph Ziegler's critical edition (1957) in Göttingen LXX. Swete's Introduction mostly agrees with Rahlfs' edition (=CATSS).

Parashot
The parashah sections listed here are based on the Aleppo Codex, and those in the missing parts of the codex (since 1947) are from Kimhi's notes, marked with an asterisk (*). Jeremiah 30 is a part of the Eleventh prophecy (Jeremiah 30-31) in the Consolations (Jeremiah 30-33) section. As above-mentioned in the "Text" section, verses 30:1-25 in Hebrew Bible below are numbered as 30:1-24; 31:1 in Christian Bible. {P}: open parashah; {S}: closed parashah.
 {P*} 30:1-3 {P*} 30:4-9 {S*} 30:10-11 {S*} 30:12-17 {S*} 30:18-22 {S*} 30:23-25 {S*}

Superscription (30:1–3)
The three verses in this part "sound a note of comfort" and serve as an introduction and subscription for chapter 30 and 31 (perhaps also chapter 32 and 33). The chapters 30 and 31 are mostly poetical, except in verse 30:1–4, 8–9; 31:1, 23–24, 38–40, whereas chapters 32 and 33 are generally prose, and the collection of these four chapters is known as "the Book of Consolation" due to its content of "hopes for the future" in contrast to the words of judgement in previous chapters.

Verse 2
Thus says the Lord God of Israel: Write all the words that I have spoken to you in a book.
"Book": likely "a scroll" to record the messages of hope in this and the following chapters (cf. 29:1; 36:2; 51:60; but not the scroll written by Baruch in 36:32).

Jacob's distress and deliverance (30:4–11)
Verse 4 is a heading to the section (verses 5–11) that calls Israel not to despair.

Verse 10
 ‘Therefore do not fear, O My servant Jacob,’ says the Lord,
 ‘Nor be dismayed, O Israel;
 For behold, I will save you from afar,
 And your seed from the land of their captivity.
 Jacob shall return, have rest and be quiet,
 And no one shall make him afraid.
 "Do not fear": a common phrase in prophecy of salvation (Isaiah 43:1).
 "My servant": this terminology for Israel parallels that of Isaiah 42:1 and Isaiah 44:1.

The healing of Zion's wound (30:12–17)
The first part (verses 12–15) brings the grim picture of judgment which befalls the people, notably with distinct sequences of words, such as "hurt", "past-healing", "wound" (verse 12); "no healing", "sore", "no restored flesh" (verse 13), "hurt", "sore", "incurable" (verse 15). However, it is immediately followed by a consolation in verses 16–17 that those bringing suffering to Israel would be caused to suffer, "the devourers would be devoured, "the exilers would be exiled".

The restoration of Jacob (30:18–22)
In this part, God gives the promise of renewal that he would "restore the fortune" (or "bring back from captivity" in 30:3) of "Jacob's tents" (or "clans"; cf. ).

The divine judgement (30:23-24)
The two verses form a fragment, which also occurs in  "with minor variations", closing this chapter with a warning about the punishment for the wicked people who oppressed Israel. This fragment continues to Jeremiah 31:1.

See also

David
Israel
Jacob
Josiah
Judah
Zion

Related Bible parts: Isaiah 35, Isaiah 41, Isaiah 42, Isaiah 43, Isaiah 44

Notes

References

Sources

 
 Ofer, Yosef (1992). "The Aleppo Codex and the Bible of R. Shalom Shachna Yellin" in Rabbi Mordechai Breuer Festschrift: Collected Papers in Jewish Studies, ed. M. Bar-Asher, 1:295-353. Jerusalem (in Hebrew). Online text (PDF)

External links

Jewish
Jeremiah 30 Hebrew with Parallel English

Christian
Jeremiah 30 English Translation with Parallel Latin Vulgate

 
30